In Greek mythology, Persinous (Ancient Greek: Περσίνοόν) was an Achaean warrior who participated in the Trojan War. He was slain by the Amazon queen, Penthesilia.

Note

References 

 Quintus Smyrnaeus, The Fall of Troy translated by Way. A. S. Loeb Classical Library Volume 19. London: William Heinemann, 1913. Online version at theio.com
 Quintus Smyrnaeus, The Fall of Troy. Arthur S. Way. London: William Heinemann; New York: G.P. Putnam's Sons. 1913. Greek text available at the Perseus Digital Library.

Achaeans (Homer)